Portishead are an English band formed in 1991 in Bristol. The band is named after Portishead, Somerset, eight miles west of Bristol, along the coast. The band comprises vocalist Beth Gibbons, producer Geoff Barrow, and musician Adrian Utley; Dave McDonald, an engineer on their first records, is sometimes cited as the fourth member.

Portishead's debut album, Dummy (1994), fused hip hop production with yearning vocals from Gibbons and an atmospheric, cinematic style reminiscent of spy film soundtracks. The album was met with commercial and critical acclaim, quickly becoming a landmark album in the emerging trip hop genre. However, the band disliked being associated with the term, and would consciously step away from that sound on later releases. Two other studio albums have been issued: Portishead in 1997 and Third in 2008, both of which received similar acclaim. In 1998, the band released a concert album, Roseland NYC Live.

History

Dummy (1994) 

Geoff Barrow and Beth Gibbons met during a coffee break at an Enterprise Allowance course in February 1991.  That year they recorded their first song for the album, "It Could Be Sweet". They then met Adrian Utley while they were recording at the Coach House Studios in Bristol, and Utley heard the first song Barrow and Gibbons had recorded, and began to exchange ideas on music. The resulting first album by Portishead, Dummy, was released in 1994. The cover features a still from the band's own short film To Kill a Dead Man. The credits indicate that at this juncture, Portishead was a duo of Geoff Barrow and Beth Gibbons. Adrian Utley, who co-produced the album with them (and who played on nine of the tracks and co-wrote eight), became an official band member shortly after its release.

Despite the band's aversion to press coverage, the album was successful in both Europe and the United States (where it sold more than 150,000 copies even before the band toured there). Dummy was positively described by the Melody Maker as "musique noire for a movie not yet made". Rolling Stone praised its music as "Gothic hip-hop". Dummy spawned three singles: "Numb", "Sour Times", and "Glory Box", and won the Mercury Music Prize in 1995. The success of the album saw the band nominated for Best British Newcomer at the 1995 Brit Awards. In 2003, the album was ranked number 419 on Rolling Stone magazine's list of the 500 Greatest Albums of All Time. The album is often considered one of the greatest trip hop albums to date and is a milestone in the definition of the genre.

Portishead (1997) 

After their initial success, Portishead withdrew from the spotlight for three years until their second album, Portishead, was released in 1997. The album's sound differed from Dummy, characterised as "grainy and harsher", with increased use of live instrumentation and less reliance on sampling. Three singles, "All Mine", "Over" and "Only You" were released, the first one achieving a Top 10 placing in the UK.

In 1997, the band performed a one-off show with strings at the Roseland Ballroom in New York City. A live album primarily featuring these new orchestral arrangements of the group's songs was released in 1998. There was also a long-form VHS video of the performance, and a DVD followed in 2002, with substantial extra material including many early music videos.

Hiatus (1999–2006) 
In 1999, Portishead recorded the song "Motherless Child" with Tom Jones for his album Reload. For the next few years, the band members concentrated on solo projects and other pursuits. In February 2005, the band appeared live for the first time in seven years at the Tsunami Benefit Concert in Bristol. Around that time, Barrow revealed that the band was in the process of writing its third album. In August 2006, the band posted two new tracks on its MySpace page (called "Key Bored 299 03" and "Greek Jam"), described by Barrow as "doodles". Around the same time, Portishead covered Serge Gainsbourg's "Un Jour Comme un Autre (Requiem for Anna)" on the tribute album Monsieur Gainsbourg Revisited.

Third (2008) 

On 2 October 2007, Portishead stated that the new album Third had been mixed and was nearly complete, and was due for release in early April 2008. The release was later pushed to 28 April. On 8 and 9 December 2007, the band curated the All Tomorrow's Parties festival in Minehead, England. The festival featured their first full live sets in nearly 10 years. They premiered five tracks from the new album: "Silence", "Hunter", "The Rip", "We Carry On", and "Machine Gun". On 21 January 2008, a European tour to support the album was announced, together with a headline spot at the Coachella Valley Music and Arts Festival on 26 April 2008, their only U.S. date on the tour.

Third was made available on Last.fm the week before release, attracting 327,000 listeners in just under 24 hours. It was the first time Last.fm had made an album available before its official release date. The album was released on 29 April 2008 to coincide with the band's appearance at Coachella. Portishead's Geoff Barrow realised a "boyhood fantasy" when Chuck D of Public Enemy joined the band onstage at the "ATP I'll Be Your Mirror" festival curated by Portishead in Asbury Park, NJ in October 2011. He contributed his verse from the Public Enemy song "Black Steel in the Hour of Chaos" over Portishead's single "Machine Gun".

Later work (2008–present) 

On 18 May 2008, Barrow expressed Portishead's enthusiasm for recording new material on their website's blog, stating that he "can't wait to write some new tunes". On 28 September 2009, Barrow announced "big plans" for a new project with a new angle, hinting that an album could arrive as soon as late 2010. Whilst the album had yet to materialise, on 9 December 2009, the band released the song "Chase the Tear" for Human Rights Day to raise money for Amnesty International UK. Additionally, on 3 December 2008, Universal Music Japan reissued the albums Dummy and Portishead in limited edition on SHM-CD.

During Summer 2011, Portishead performed at a number of festivals in Europe, including, Pohoda Festival, Exit Festival, Benicàssim Festival in Spain, Rock Werchter, Paleo Festival, Roskilde Festival, the Hurricane/Southside Festivals in Germany, and the Super Bock Super Rock music festival. The band also headlined and curated the line-up for two All Tomorrow's Parties music festivals entitled I'll Be Your Mirror, in London at Alexandra Palace on 23 and 24 July. The second took place in Asbury Park, New Jersey, from 30 September – 2 October. Portishead then visited several cities in North America, including New York, Montreal, Toronto, Chicago, Mexico City, Los Angeles, Berkeley, Seattle, Vancouver, and Denver during October. The Chicago Tribune hailed the concert and noted: "horror-movie accents—Gothic organ, guitar lines thick with menacing reverb, spooky theremin—ensured a certain darkness". They finished their tour with a jaunt to Australia and New Zealand. Barrow stated in a Rolling Stone interview that he would begin work on his portion of the album in January 2012, jokingly pointing out that it could be another decade before a new album is released.

In 2013 the band headlined the Other Stage at the Glastonbury Music festival and embarked on a European tour. In summer 2014, they played several concerts around Europe. 2015 saw Portishead continue to perform live, playing festivals such as fib (Benicassim, Spain), Latitude (Southwold, Suffolk, UK), and the Montreux Jazz Festival (Montreux, Switzerland). Additionally, Portishead produced a cover of ABBA's song "SOS" for the soundtrack to the movie High-Rise which had a Gala screening at the London Film Festival on 9 October 2015. In 2016, the band won an Ivor Novello Award for Outstanding Contribution to British Music. On 22 June 2016, Portishead released a video for "SOS" that recontextualized the song in the wake of the then-recent murder of MP Jo Cox and the Brexit vote.

On 2 May 2022, Portishead performed for the first time in seven years at O2 Academy Bristol. Organized by War Child UK, the concert benefited refugees and children affected by the Ukraine war.

Style and influences
Portishead's music was influenced by a wide range of singers and composers. Gibbons's voice has been compared to singer Billie Holiday. Utley mentioned the spaghetti western guitar composed by Ennio Morricone; he said that "[Morricone's] The Good, the Bad and the Ugly is the sort of soundtrack that I love".

Discography 

 Dummy (1994)
 Portishead (1997)
 Third (2008)

Awards and nominations
{| class=wikitable
|-
! Year !! Awards !! Work !! Category !! Result !! Ref.
|-
| rowspan=5|1995
| Mercury Prize
| Dummy
| Album of the Year
| 
|-
| NME Awards
| rowspan=4|Themselves
| Best Dance Act
| 
|
|-
| MTV Europe Music Awards
| Best New Act
| 
|
|-
| Edison Awards
| Best International Dance/Rap
| 
|-
| Brit Awards
| British Breakthrough Act
| 
|
|-
| 1997
| GAFFA Awards (Denmark)
| rowspan=2|Beth Gibbons
| Best Foreign Female Act
| 
|
|-
| 1998
| Žebřík Music Awards
| Best International Female
| 
| 
|-
| 1999
| Online Music Awards
| rowspan=4|Themselves
| Best Alternative Fansite
| 
|
|-
| rowspan=5|2008
| rowspan=6|Rober Awards Music Prize
| Best Band
| 
| rowspan=2|
|-
| Cutting Edge
| 
|-
| Best Electronica
| 
| 
|-
| Third
| Album of the Year
| 
| 
|-
| "The Rip"
| Single of the Year
| 
| 
|-
| 2011
| rowspan=2|Themselves
| Best Live Artist
| 
| 
|-
| rowspan=3|2016
| Ivor Novello Awards
| Outstanding Contribution to British Music
| 
|
|-
| Music Week Sync Awards
| rowspan=2|"SOS"
| Film Soundtrack 
| 
|-
| Rober Awards Music Poll
| Best Cover Version
| 
|

See also 
 Beak, musical project with Geoff Barrow
 Beth Gibbons and Rustin Man

References

External links 

 
 
 

 
English electronic music groups
English alternative rock groups
English experimental rock groups
Trip hop groups
Downtempo musicians
British musical trios
Go! Beat artists
Island Records artists
Mercury Records artists
Musical groups established in 1991
1991 establishments in England
Musical groups from Bristol